Kaushik Rai is an Indian politician who is a Member of the Assam Legislative Assembly , representing the BJP. He won his seat in the 2021 elections in the Lahkipur constituency.

Education
He has a B. Com degree from Gurucharan College and a Bachelor of Laws degree from Assam University.

References

Assam MLAs 2021–2026
Year of birth missing (living people)
Living people
People from Cachar district
Bharatiya Janata Party politicians from Assam

Socials
Twitter